In topology, a branch of mathematics, Pachner moves, named after Udo Pachner, are ways of replacing a triangulation of a piecewise linear manifold by a different triangulation of a homeomorphic manifold. Pachner moves are also called bistellar flips. Any two triangulations of a piecewise linear manifold are related by a finite sequence of Pachner moves.

Definition 
Let  be the -simplex.    is a combinatorial n-sphere with its triangulation as the boundary of the n+1-simplex. 

Given a triangulated piecewise linear (PL) n-manifold , and a co-dimension 0 subcomplex  together with a simplicial isomorphism , the Pachner move on N associated to C is the triangulated manifold . By design, this manifold is PL-isomorphic to  but the isomorphism does not preserve the triangulation.

See also
 Flip graph
 Unknotting problem

References 
.

Topology
Geometric topology
Structures on manifolds